These hits topped the Ultratop 50 charts in 2005 (see 2005 in music).

See also
2005 in music

References

2005 in Belgium
Belgium Ultratop 50
2005